The 1983 Sultan Azlan Shah Cup was the inaugural edition of field hockey tournament the Sultan Azlan Shah Cup held from Aug 22-28 at the Tun Razak Stadium in Kuala Lumpur.

Participating nations
Five countries participated in the first tournament:

References

External links
Official website

1983 in field hockey
1983
1983 in Malaysian sport
1983 in Indian sport
1983 in Pakistani sport
1983 in Australian sport
1983 in New Zealand sport